Willow Bunch may refer to:

 Willow Bunch, Saskatchewan, a town in Saskatchewan, Canada
 Willow Bunch (electoral district), a former federal electoral district in Saskatchewan
 Willow Bunch (provincial electoral district), a former provincial electoral division for the Legislative Assembly of Saskatchewan
 Willow Bunch Lake, a salt lake in Saskatchewan
 Rural Municipality of Willow Bunch No. 42, a rural municipality of Saskatchewan